The Erzin is a river of Tuva, Russia. It is a right tributary of the Tes-Khem.

References

Rivers of Tuva
Endorheic basins of Asia